Abobaku is a 2010 short film written and produced by Femi Odugbemi and directed by Niji Akanni.

Synopsis 
Aremu who must die with the king (Abobaku) was caught between pleasing his lover and following the tradition. He later got to know the king was  poisoned by one of the Chief hence his health could be preserved as he pleases his pregnant partner.

Awards 
The film won the Most Outstanding Short Film at the Zuma Film Festival held in 2010 and Best Costume at the 6th Africa Movie Academy Awards as held on 10 April 2010 at the Gloryland Cultural Center in Yenagoa, Bayelsa State, Nigeria.

Reception 
10 years after Abobaku was released, it was played at Wole Soyinka International Cultural Exchange to celebrate the writer's 86th birthday . The film was similar to Wole Soyinka's Play ' Death and the King's Horsemen's.

References

Nigerian short films
2010 films

2010 short films